Pelonides is a genus of checkered beetles in the family Cleridae. There are about seven described species in Pelonides.

Species
These seven species belong to the genus Pelonides:
 Pelonides granulatipennis (Schaeffer, 1904)
 Pelonides humeralis (Horn, 1868)
 Pelonides quadrinotata
 Pelonides quadripunctata (four-spotted checkered beetle)
 Pelonides quadripunctatus (Say, 1823)
 Pelonides scabripennis (LeConte, 1866)
 Pelonides similis Knull, 1938

References

Further reading

External links

 

Enopliinae
Articles created by Qbugbot